Angela Carolyn Owen (formerly Owen-Taylor) is an Australian politician who has been a Councillor of Brisbane City Council (BCC), the local government authority for the City of Brisbane in the Australian state of Queensland, since 2008.

Political career

Local government
Cr Angela Owen (formerly known as Owen-Taylor) was first elected to Brisbane City Council as the inaugural Councillor for the Ward of Parkinson, then re-elected in 2012. After a change in ward boundaries from Parkinson Ward to Calamvale Ward in 2016, Cr Angela Owen was elected as the inaugural Councillor for Calamvale Ward, then re-elected in 2020.

She has additionally served as Chairman of Council. Deputy Chairman of Council, Deputy Chairman of the Finance, Economic Development and Administration Committees, Deputy Chairman of City Business and Local Assets, Deputy Chair of Public and Active Transport as well as Deputy to the Lord Mayor on Multicultural Affairs and International Relations, Chairman of the Sister Cities Committee and Deputy to the Lord Mayor on the $215m City Hall Restoration project.

Federal government
Owen is a member of the Liberal National Party. In March 2019, she was endorsed as the LNP candidate for the Australian House of Representatives in the marginal Brisbane seat of Moreton and contested the 2019 Australian federal election. Owen polled well in first preference votes; however, the incumbent Labor member retained the seat.

References

External links
Ward profile

Liberal National Party of Queensland politicians
Politicians from Brisbane
Living people
Queensland local councillors
Year of birth missing (living people)
Women local councillors in Australia